Nisa is a municipality in Portalegre District in Portugal. The population in 2011 was 7,450, in an area of 575.68 km2.

The present Mayor is Maria Idalina Alves Trindade (PS - Partido Socialista). The municipal holiday is Easter Monday.

In addition, it lends its name to one of the most famous Portuguese sheep cheeses (Certificate of Protected Origin or D.O.P.).

Parishes
Administratively, the municipality is divided into 7 civil parishes (freguesias):
 Alpalhão
 Arez e Amieira do Tejo
 Espírito Santo, Nossa Senhora da Graça e São Simão
 Montalvão
 Santana
 São Matias
 Tolosa

Notable people 
 Álvaro Semedo (ca.1585 - 1658) a Portuguese Jesuit priest and missionary in China.

References

External links

Town Hall official website
Photos from Nisa

 
Populated places in Portalegre District
Municipalities of Portalegre District